Lifshitz (or Lifschitz) is a surname, which may be derived from the Polish city of Głubczyce (German: Leobschütz).

The surname may refer to:

Asaf Lifshitz (* 1942), Israeli sculptor
Chava Lifshitz (1936–2005), Austrian-Israeli chemist
Dovid Lifshitz (1906-1993), Suvalker Rav, taught at Yeshiva University
Rabbi Eliezer Meir Lifshitz (1879–1946), for whom the Lifshitz College of Education was named
Evgeny Lifshitz (1915–1985), Soviet physicist
Ilya Lifshitz (1917–1982), Soviet physicist (brother of Evgeny)
J.D. Lifshitz (born 1992), American film director
Miguel Lifschitz (1955–2021), Argentine politician, former mayor of the city of Rosario, Santa Fe
Mikhail Lifshitz (1905–1983), Soviet literary critic and aesthetics philosopher
Mosze Lifszyc (Aleksander Ford, 1908–1980), Polish film director
Nechama Lifshitz (1927–2017), Soviet–Israeli singer
Ofer Lifschitz (born 1958), chairman of Brit Olam party, Israel
Ralph Lauren (born Ralph Lifshitz 1939), American fashion designer and business executive
Sébastien Lifshitz (born 1968), French screenwriter and director
Vladimir Lifschitz (born 1947), Soviet-American computer scientist
Yaron Lifschitz, Australian theatre director most notable for his involvement in the circus arts

Jewish surnames